The 2020 Australia women's Tri-Nation Series was a cricket tournament that took place in Australia in January and February 2020. It was a tri-nation series between Australia women, England women and the India women cricket teams, with the matches played as Women's Twenty20 International (WT20I) fixtures. All three teams used the series as their final warm-up ahead of the 2020 ICC Women's T20 World Cup.

Ahead of the fifth match of the series, the Australian team were presented with the ICC Women's Championship trophy, after winning the 2017–20 ICC Women's Championship tournament. In the sixth match, Australia beat England by 16 runs, to advance to the final along with India. In the final, Australia beat India by 11 runs to win the series, with Jess Jonassen taking her first five-wicket haul in a WT20I match.

Squads

Points table

WT20I series

1st WT20I

2nd WT20I

3rd WT20I

4th WT20I

5th WT20I

6th WT20I

Final

Notes

References

External links
 Series home at ESPN Cricinfo

2020 in English women's cricket
2020 in Indian cricket
cricket
2019–20 Australian women's cricket season
2020 in women's cricket
International cricket competitions in 2019–20
International women's cricket competitions in Australia
Women's Twenty20 cricket international competitions
January 2020 sports events in Australia
February 2020 sports events in Australia